The following is a list of characters from the MTV comedy-drama television series Awkward, which was created by Lauren Iungerich, and follows Jenna Hamilton, a Palos Verdes, California, teenager who struggles with her identity, especially after an accident is misconstrued as a suicide attempt.

Main characters

Jenna Hamilton

Jennifer "Jenna" Hamilton (Ashley Rickards), a 15-year-old "invisible" girl in high school with an irreverent, optimistic outlook on life, who just wants to fit in. Things go from bad to worse when she gets a mysterious "" letter in which the writer says she could disappear and no one would notice. Her reaction (she slips and breaks her arm in the bathroom, knocking over a bottle of pills in the process) leads to a misunderstanding of epic proportions causing everyone to believe that Jenna's accident was a suicide attempt. She loses her virginity to Matty, but he does not want to take their relationship public, which causes complications. Jenna is best friends with Tamara and Ming. She is often the target of ridicule from Sadie Saxton, a rich, ill-tempered and popular cheerleader. Later in the first season, she begins a relationship with Jake Rosati. In the second season, Jenna tells Jake she isn't a virgin leading Jake to become somewhat jealous. After Jake breaks up with her, she admits that she is still in love with Matty. Jenna and Matty officially get back together in the season 2 finale but she wonders if she made the right decision. At the beginning of season 3, Jenna starts to have feelings for the new boy in school, Collin and tries to get over those feelings while still dating Matty. Soon she cheats on Matty with Collin, breaks up with Matty, and starts dating Collin. While dating Collin, her personality, wardrobe and attitude began to change, making her more reckless and selfish, and as a result she is alienated by her friends. It is later revealed that Collin was still in a sexual relationship with his ex-girlfriend. Jenna ends her relationship with Collin, and manages to make everything right with her friends and family. In season 4, while looking at a college, she meets a guy named Luke and starts dating him. However, Luke broke up with Jenna as he felt that she still has a lot of growing up to do and has to deal with all the high school drama after she ditches him to help Sadie find Matty. Towards the end of season 4 she implies that she still loves Matty but will not act on it because of the drama it previously caused and how she had hurt him by cheating.

Matty McKibben
Matthew "Matty" McKibben (Beau Mirchoff), one of Jenna's main love interests and best friends with Jake Rosati. Despite being popular, athletic, and handsome, Matty is extremely concerned with his peers' perception of him. He had sex with Jenna in a supply closet at summer camp. He didn't want anyone to know what he did with her, creating their secret on/off relationship throughout the first season. She dumps him when she realizes that he will never out their relationship. However, he asks her to prom, which she accepts, but he backs out due to the fact that Jake is in love with Jenna. She thinks that he actually just does not want to be seen with her in public, which causes her to dump him and go to prom with Jake and others. Jenna and Jake kiss at prom, thus ending Jenna's relationship with Matty. However, later in season 2 on episode 8, Jake finds out about Matty and Jenna's secret relationship and dumps her because it made him feel cheated and lied to. Matty later shows up at Jenna's house to comfort her, but both end up kissing as Jake watches to his horror from the window. Eventually Matty and Jake become friends again and tell Jenna that she can choose who she wants to be with. Matty and Jenna officially get back together in the season 2 finale. During season 3, Matty and Jenna grow distant, due to Jenna having growing feelings for Collin. In the summer finale, Matty admits that he was embarrassed by Jenna after her accident because he thought she tried to commit suicide, as her accident was the same day they had sex for the first time. After he admits this, Jenna makes out with Collin in his car as Matty walks up; it is unknown if he saw them kissing or not. At her surprise birthday party, Jenna walks in kissing Colin, which leads to a fallout and results in Matty and Jenna's subsequent break-up, despite Matty wanting to carry on. In season 4, Jenna introduces Matty to Eva, a new girl, and they start dating. At the end of the mid-season finale, it is revealed that Eva is pregnant. However Matty finds out that Amber (Eva) was lying about being pregnant and breaks up with her. He rebuilds his friendship with Jenna by telling her that she was trying to be a good friend and he was a terrible one. He meets a new girl named Gabby and eventually starts a relationship with her, despite her worries that he was just going to hurt her. Throughout their relationship, Gabby grows more and more jealous of Jenna, while Matty is oblivious. In the season 4 finale, Matty realizes that he still has feelings for Jenna but, after talking with Lacey, he understands that he has to let her go and let her move on, without having any ties when she goes to college.

Lacey Hamilton
Lacey Hamilton (Nikki DeLoach), Jenna's mother, who is clueless but well-intentioned about raising a teenager. Lacey and Jenna's father Kevin were 17 when Jenna was born. Lacey, who is extremely concerned with things like appearance and popularity, had Jenna when she was a teenager with her high school sweetheart Kevin, and gave up on her dreams of going to college, using the funds to get breast implants instead. Lacey finds it easy to find faults in her daughter, because she wants Jenna to have everything Lacey could not have after becoming pregnant. Lacey even goes so far to "help" her daughter change her image by writing her an anonymous "" letter that sets off the chain of events that lead to Jenna becoming known as "Suicide Girl." Eventually, Jenna finds out that Lacey wrote the brutal letter. Lacey is confronted by Jenna about writing the letter, and Jenna later reveals the information to Kevin. Kevin is so disgusted by this that he moves out, much to both Lacey and Jenna's dismay. At Ally's wedding, Lacey's ex-boyfriend Ben appears and begins making moves on her. In the immediate aftermath of the wedding, Jenna finds them kissing at the poolside. The next day, Jenna informs her that Kevin may want a divorce, which makes things worse. Eventually, Kevin returns home and calls off plans for a divorce, and Jenna slowly regains her respect and trust in Lacey. In season 4 Lacey applies to college and is accepted, much to Jenna's chagrin. But in a season finale turn of events, Lacey reveals she is pregnant, and Kevin and Jenna urge her to still attend college. Lacey is close friends with her high school best friend Ally (whom Jenna begrudgingly calls "Aunt Ally") and later with Val Marks, Jenna's eccentric high school counselor.

Tamara Kaplan
Tamara "T" Kaplan (Jillian Rose Reed), one of Jenna's best friends. She is extremely loud and outgoing, but openly desires to be accepted and popular. She has an on-again-off-again relationship with Ricky Schwartz, which has caused her to behave irrationally in the past. When Jenna accidentally kisses Ricky at a party, Tamara ends their friendship by claiming that she was the one who wrote the  letter. She quickly realizes that Jenna was not responsible for her actions that night, and the two reconcile and she admits that she do not really send the letter, she just said it to spite Jenna for hurting her. During the season one finale, Tamara ends her relationship with Ricky after finding out that he asked three other girls to the winter formal before her. They get back together at the dance when Ricky quotes a Missed-Connections and that he placed for her. By the second season, Tamara and Ricky are together, but she breaks up with him once again when she catches him kissing another girl during a school assembly. She spends the rest of the season trying to get over him, despite the fact that he has started dating Sadie. In the second-season finale, she makes out with Jake because she is upset over how bad the past year has been for her. Starting at the end of season 2 Jake and Tamara start a relationship together. Tamara replaces Lissa on the cheerleading team after she gets into a cheer accident. In season 4, Jake and Tamara break up over her controlling and bossy attitude which contrasts to his new boyband personality. However, Tamara desperately want him back, so she creates a fake profile to keep in contact with Jake and tries to find out what Jake really thinks of her. Eventually he finds out and despite his initial reaction, they become friends again. At the end of Season 4, Tamara gets engaged to a man named Adam whom she met in a bar and is in basic military training. She accepts his proposal, thinking that he is going to serve somewhere far away and they can break up within the first few months but in reality, he will be in California which makes her realise that she may be a teenage bride.

Jake Rosati
Jacob "Jake" Rosati (Brett Davern), Jenna's other love interest. He is the class president, popular, smart, and outgoing. Jake is best friends with Matty and started off dating Lissa before the beginning of Season One, but eventually broke up with her due to his feelings for Jenna and the way Lissa and Sadie treat him. Unlike Matty, who thinks with the team, Jake thinks for himself. He leads, rather than follows, and is a sensitive guy with a heart of gold. Jake and Jenna grow closer, leading him to develop a crush on her. At first Jenna does not reciprocate these feelings, but she eventually realizes that he is kind, honest, and thoughtful towards her. He doesn't mind being seen in public with Jenna, unlike Matty, and he doesn't care about what other people think of him. At the start of season two, Jake is publicly dating Jenna. However, he becomes constantly jealous of the guy Jenna was in love with before him, not knowing it was Matty. Soon, Jake finds out about their relationship and breaks up with Jenna, only to regret his decision later. However, it is too late to revoke his decision to break up with Jenna when he accidentally sees Jenna and Matty kissing. At the end of the season 2 finale, Jake begins a relationship with Tamara. In season 4, Jake and Tamara break up over her controlling and bossy attitude which contrasts to his new boyband personality. However, Tamara desperately want him back, so she creates a fake profile to keep in contact with Jake and tries to find out what Jake really thinks of her. Eventually he finds out and despite his initial reaction, they become friends again. After brief flings with a M.I.L.F and Tamara, Jake sleeps with Matty's girlfriend Gabby, after being rejected by his first-choice college. Feeling guilty, Jake goes to confess to Matty, who tells him he doesn't want to be with Gabby anymore, so Jake stays quiet.

Sadie Saxton
Sadie Saxton (Molly Tarlov), Jenna's nemesis. Sadie becomes the most popular girl at school thanks to her parents buying her influence, however, she is the one with the biggest weight issues of the "popular kids". In view of her prominence she plays in the generalization of a mean young lady and numerous adversaries and irresolute rivals at school, particularly her most outstanding adversary and foe of Jenna Hamilton. Different adversaries incorporate, Ming Huang and Clark Stevenson, Amber Horn, Tamara Kaplan, Angelique Welch and Collin Jennings. In any case, regardless of this, she has a closest companion named Lissa Miller, and is dear companions with Matty McKibben, whom she already really liked. All through the arrangement, she has had two associations with Ricky Schwartz who undermined her, yet later kicked the bucket and furthermore Austin Welch, however has said a final farewell to him since she was "unfaithful" yet regardless she adores him. Despite Sadie's popularity and power, Jenna senses that Sadie feels she never measures up. Sadie makes excuses for her bad behavior because she feels entitled; she thinks the world owes her for having to suffer with the "fat gene", that she has everything except the perfect body. Her infamous catchphrase is a very sarcastic and distinctive "You're welcome," that she normally says after a rude comment. She had a secret crush on Matty which was mainly the reason why she hated Jenna, but in the season two premiere, she hooks up with him at a New Year's Eve party and realizes that he's nothing special. Ironically, Jenna sympathizes with Sadie and tries to help her but her attempts are misinterpreted by Sadie as the same sort of mean girl tricks she is known to do. After her failed hookup with Matty, she kisses Ricky Schwartz which leads to a secret relationship. Her and Ricky's secret relationship soon ends when she finds him kissing Clark in the season 2 finale. In a drunken stupor, she comes close to apologizing to Jenna but passes out on Tamara's lap. In season 3, Sadie starts dating a guy named Austin, but in season 4 he breaks up with her, because she lied to him even though she didn't do anything. In the second half of season 4 Sadie begins dating Sergio, her co-worker from the food truck, who genuinely seems to care for her despite her rude and sarcastic comments.

Valerie Marks
Valerie Marks (Desi Lydic), the school counselor. She is the Palos Hills High School's Guidance Counselor, and later turned into the bad habit foremost, yet drops it to end up noticeably a Guidance Counselor, yet was later let go by the school's essential after he read the school's daily paper and Jenna Hamilton's article of Valerie. Be that as it may, she later got rehired. She clearly has her own problems as she tries too hard to be like the teenagers she is there to help. She's a lonely person who feels her gift in life is helping people. She crosses boundaries and acts inappropriately around students; when Valerie is assigned to talk to Jenna once a week, their relationship becomes increasingly unprofessional as Valerie comes to think of Jenna as her best friend. On Jenna's sixteenth birthday, as a present she gives her the movie, Sixteen Candles, and also quotes famous lines from the film. Soon "Val" becomes friendly with Jenna's mom, "Lace", and are seen together quite frequently. She is the Palos Hills High School's Guidance Counselor, and later became the vice principal, but drops it to become a Guidance Counselor, but was later fired by the school's principal, towards the end of season three, after he read the school's newspaper and Jenna Hamilton's article of Valerie (during her rebellious phase). But she later got rehired after her appeal after the help of Lacey Hamilton, Jenna Hamilton, Matty McKibben and Bailey Parker. In the second half of season 4 Val begins to date "Biggie" Will, her former mascot/stalker/school coach. At the end of season 4 Val and Will reveal they're quitting the school and exploring the world after the end of the school year.

Ming Huang
Ming Huang (Jessica Lu), Jenna's other best friend. While she is known for her sense of fashion, Ming was also cautious, who was always on her toes because of the Asian Mafia's then-leader Becca (Jessika Van). She is portrayed as a down-to-earth indie-style teenager with strict Chinese parents. Ming gets mad at Jenna for telling Tamara about her secret relationship with Matty instead of telling her and because of that she feels left out, but still remains supportive of Jenna. In season 2, she gets caught up in the Asian group while trying to help Jenna in Sex, Lies and the Sanctuary. Ming eventually finds a boy that she likes, Fred Wu, although he used to be Becca's boyfriend so she tries to ruin Ming's life. Eventually Fred leaves Palos Hill High School because he is scared for Ming's safety. She swears to get revenge at the end of season 2. In season 3, she becomes the leader of the Asian 'Mafia' after hitting Becca and putting her in her place. Ming and Fred get back together after she takes hold of the mafia. Ming has a unique sense of style compared to the other female cast members (other than Valerie Marks). Her fashion choices appear to store-bought, but glued, cut and sewn to appear to be home-made, even adding accessories such as buttons and ribbons to make it twice as different. She also not usually seen without wearing specially made hats. She also wears glasses. In Season 3, she switched her short black hair for shoulder-length curly blonde hair. Ming was written off the show and hasn't been referenced since 4.01. In No Woman is An Island, she is mentioned that she went off to boarding school so she can get into better colleges. After confusion between Jenna and Valerie, it is implied that the Asian Mafia kidnapped her.

Lissa Miller
Lissa Miller (Greer Grammer), Jake's ex-girlfriend, and Sadie's best friend. She is usually identified as being ditsy, and for having very strong Christian beliefs. At the beginning of the show, Lissa is very insecure about her relationship with Jake due to her taking a virginity pledge, and often gets advice from Sadie. Like that she could have anal sex (which she called her "be-hymen") because that didn't count, and to take a naked picture of Jenna in order to humiliate her. When she finds out that Jake kissed Jenna, Lissa publicly slaps her, due to Sadie's encouragement, however she does not seem happy with her actions. When Jake breaks up with her, she realizes Sadie destroyed her relationship with Jake due to her constant meddling, and ends their friendship. In the beginning of the second season, Lissa asks for forgiveness from Jenna, and tries to form a friendship with her. She also decides to take Sadie back, because she believes that God put Sadie in her life as a test. It is also shown that she still has feelings for Jake. In the fifth episode of three season, she also lost her virginity to Ricky Schwartz. She most likely killed Ricky Schwartz after making out and having sex with him after eating Thai food containing nuts, which he had an allergy to. She was going to own up but Sadie manages to talk her out of it, convincing her that it wasn't her. After a trip to Africa, Lissa returns with an adoptive brother, who she begins a brief fling with before deciding (after having sex) it's not best. The fling causes lots of tension between Lissa and her mother, due to her mother deeming it 'wrong', however it is obvious that she is also attracted to him. The fling also brings to light the fact that her dad is gay, which he dismisses by going to 'gay' camp to turn back to "normal". She is the best friend of mean girl Sadie Saxton, senior student at Palos Hills High School and head cheerleader.

Recurring characters

Palos Hills students
 Wesam Keesh as Kyle Cohen, a mysterious boy who attends school with Jenna. He walks around with a shirt that says "Jenna Lives" and Jenna comes to believe that he is obsessed with her. She later gives up on the idea of him being a stalker when she finds out that Jenna Lives is actually his band, only for it to turn out that he is, indeed, stalking her. He reappears in season 2, having given up on Jenna Lives and now running a club called "Take It Outside", a phrase Tamara coined, leading to her believing that he is now stalking her. Kyle's odd behavior is seen as mostly harmless to the other characters. In season 5, he strikes up a friendship with Matty after Matty falls from popularity. He asks Jenna to sign his yearbook with an already-inscribed message, insinuating that he still harbors a romantic obsession for her.
 Kelly Sry as Fred Wu (seasons 1–3, guest seasons 4–5), Ming's boyfriend. He used to date Becca, the original leader of the Asian mafia. He is described as the non-stereotypical Asian. In the season 4 premiere, he is revealed to be devastated by Ming's sudden departure, ostensibly to escape the wrath of the Asian mafia. In season 5, he is shown taking a girl to prom who is very much pregnant.
 Elizabeth Whitson as Eva Mansfield/Amber Horne (season 4), a new girl at Palos Hills who attempts to become friends with Jenna and Tamara, and later Matty and Jake. Both Jenna and Sadie distrust her as she has a tendency to brag about her fast-paced former life in New York City and other various exciting things. Later, she dates Matty and tries to trick him into staying with her when she lies about being pregnant. Jenna and Sadie put aside their differences to reveal Eva to be a pathological liar who invented nearly every aspect of her life as the Palos Hills students know it.
 Evan Crooks as Theo Abbott (season 4–5) and Monty Geer as Cole Higgins (season 4–5), two gay students at Palos Hills who run in the same social circle as Jenna. They are best friends. Both Theo and Cole find their peers vapid and insufferable, and amuse themselves by messing with them.
 Erinn Westbrook as Gabby (season 4–5), a senior at Palos Hills who becomes Matty's new love interest. She is a tennis player with a scholarship to Stanford University, and she is a virgin. Jenna is jealous of Gabby when they first meet, but they eventually become friends. After Jenna reveals that she and Matty kissed after his birthday party, their new friendship becomes strained. Gabby begins to feel shut out by Matty, who just met his "bio-dad" and seems to be harboring feelings for Jenna still. She sleeps with Jake, but shortly thereafter reunites with Matty after Lacey convinces Matty to leave Jenna alone. Once Matty finds out Gabby and Jake slept together, they broke up and she pursues an actual relationship with Jake.
 Jessika Van as Becca (seasons 2–3), the ringleader of the Asians or the "Asian Mafia" at Palos Hills High School. She frequently conflicts with Ming, and is considered Ming's arch-rival in the series, having previously been in a relationship with Ming's boyfriend (seasons 2 and 3), Fred Wu. Knowledge is her power, and allows her to fulfill her own agenda. She also manipulates others for her own personal gain. Becca's not out to help Ming, but rather to help herself. She knows everything about every Asian in Palos Hills, and demonstrates this by describing the origins of Ming's Grandparents. In the episode "Reality Check," Ming punches Becca in the face. However, instead of being suspended, Becca attains a number of signed affidavits (from the Asian students) saying that she ran into a door by accident, thereby demonstrating her clout within the Asians of Palos Hills High. However, as she is forced to leave the school, Ming Huang takes over as the ringleader of the Asian mafia.
 Nolan Gerard Funk as Collin Jennings (season 3), a student in Jenna's creative writing class. They share a bit of competitive animosity with one another. He and Jenna start to get closer when he comes to support her at her reading at the local coffee house. Jenna starts to have fantasies about Collin despite still being with Matty. After a party, Collin offers to give Jenna a ride to meet up with Matty, and they end up making out in the car. Jenna briefly dates Collin after breaking up with Matty, at which point she begins exhibiting self-destructive behavior that alienates her from her friends. After Collin sleeps with his ex, Jenna ends their relationship.
 Matthew Fahey as Ricky Schwartz (seasons 1–2), Tamara's on-again off-again crush. He is in the band with Tamara, and is shown to be quite the player. Jenna accidentally kissed him at her house party, which caused severe tension between her and Tamara. After asking Tamara out to the winter formal, she breaks up with him when she finds out that he asked three other girls before her. But he wins her back at the dance by quoting an ad he placed for Tamara on Missed Connections. In season two, he develops a secret relationship with Sadie, which ends after Sadie catches him making out with Clark. He often calls Tamara "beautiful" as a nickname, and Sadie "doll-face". He dies from a peanut allergy at the beginning of the season 3 premiere, but he reveals via Sadie's spirit board that his death was actually no accident.
 Joey Haro as Clark Stevenson (seasons 1–3), a gay student at Palos Hills. They grow closer during season two when Jenna attends a youth Christian retreat, where he explains his religious beliefs. In the season two finale, he reveals himself as the anonymous poster on her blog, and is caught making out with Ricky Schwartz, later admits Ricky cheated on him with several girls.
 McKaley Miller as Bailey Parker (season 3), a freshman at Palos Hills whom Jenna befriends near the end of season three. She is labeled as a slut by the school, although she's actually quite the opposite. Jenna is her only friend. She has feelings for Matty, but also knows that Jenna never got over him and places their friendship above a potential relationship with Matty.

Other characters
 Mike Faiola as Kevin Hamilton, Jenna's father. He is shown as being the more responsible parent as opposed to his wife and to be caring and supportive to Jenna through rough times. He and Lacey separate after she tells him that she wrote the letter. By the end of season 2, Kevin and Lacey are back together. Soon after Jenna gets birth control pills, Kevin finds them, and irrationally calls Matty's parents, telling them that the two are having sex. This leads to a fight between families over dinner and leads to Matty's week stay at the Hamilton house.
 Barret Swatek as Aunt Ally, Jenna's mom's best friend who first appeared in the season one episode "The Adventures of Aunt Ally and the Lil' Bitch". She smokes, drinks, and shows a clear disdain for Jenna, whom she refers to as "Lil' Bitch", since Lacey had her at a young age. In season two, she reappeared breaking the news that she will marry Sadie's wealthy uncle. When Sadie's father goes to prison and her mom flees to New Mexico, Ally agrees to take Sadie in and acts as a guardian and reluctant "mother figure."
 Laura Ashley Samuels as Courtney (season 2), a freshman at Palos Hills High School who briefly dates Matty.
 Niko Pepaj as Sergio (seasons 4–5), an employee at a food truck that Sadie reluctantly begins working at when her parents lose their fortune. Sergio immediately expresses flirtatious interest in Sadie, though their relationship is adversarial to begin with. They later begin dating in earnest, with Sergio drawing out more of Sadie's sensitive side.
 Shane Harper as Austin Welch (season 3–4), an intelligent kid with weird tendencies who displays an interest in Sadie. While Sadie initially rebuffs his advances, she eventually caves. At the end of season three, they said "I love you" to one another. They later break up after Sadie loses Austin's trust by lying to him.
 Anthony Michael Hall as Mr. Hart (season 3), Jenna's creative writing teacher who takes pride in pushing his students outside of their comfort zones. He is also a former novelist.

See also

 List of Awkward episodes

References

Lists of American comedy-drama television series characters
Lists of American sitcom television characters
Lists of teen drama characters